The North Carolina General Assembly is the bicameral legislature of the State government of North Carolina. The legislature consists of two chambers: the Senate and the House of Representatives. The General Assembly meets in the North Carolina Legislative Building in Raleigh, North Carolina, United States.

The General Assembly drafts and legislates the state laws of North Carolina, also known as the General Statutes. The General Assembly is a bicameral legislature, consisting of the North Carolina House of Representatives (formerly called the North Carolina House of Commons until 1868) and the North Carolina Senate. Since 1868, the House has had 120 members, while the Senate has had 50 members. There are no term limits for either chamber.

History

Colonial period

The North Carolina legislature traces its roots to the first assembly for the "County of Albemarle", which was convened in 1665 by Governor William Drummond. Albemarle County was the portion of the British colony of Carolina (under the control of the "Lords Proprietors" before becoming a royal province in 1729) that would eventually become North Carolina.

From approximately 1666 to 1697, the governor, his council, and representatives of various precincts and towns, elected by male freeholders, sat together as a unicameral legislature. By 1697, this evolved into a bicameral body, with the governor and his council as the upper house, and the House of Burgesses as the elected lower house. The House, sometimes known simply as "the Assembly", could only meet when called by the governor, but it was allowed to set its own rules and to elect its own Speaker. The House also controlled the salary of the governor and withheld that salary when the governor displeased a majority of the House. Naturally, conflicts between the governor and the legislature were frequent.

According to one early compilation of the "Laws of North Carolina", the first "General Biennial Assembly" was held "at the House of Capt. Richard Sanderson, at Little-River begun on the 17th day of November, 1715 and continued by several Adjournments, until the 19th Day of January, 1715 ". At that session, the Assembly adopted many of the laws of England that remained in effect through most of the 20th century. Notable in this category is the Statute of Elizabeth or Statute of Frauds, which was not repealed until the General Assembly adopted the Uniform Fraudulent Transfer Act in July 1997.

Revolution and early statehood

In 1774 and 1775, the people of the colony elected a provincial congress, independent of the royal governor, as the American Revolution began. Most of its members were also members of what would be the last House of Burgesses. There would be five provincial congresses. The fifth Congress approved the first constitution in 1776.

With the signing of the United States Declaration of Independence, the United States became an independent nation with different legislatures in each colony. Because of the history of distrust of the executive, the North Carolina constitution firmly established the General Assembly, as it was now called, as the most powerful branch of the state government. The bicameral legislature, whose members would all be elected by the people, would itself elect all the officers of the executive and judicial branches. As William S. Powell wrote in North Carolina: A History, "The legislative branch henceforth would have the upper hand. The governor would be the creature of the assembly, elected by it and removable by it. ... The governor could not take any important step without the advice and consent of the 'council of state,' and he had no voice in the appointment or removal of [council of state members]."

This constitution was not submitted to a vote of the people. The Congress simply adopted it and elected Richard Caswell, the last president of the Congress, as acting governor until the new legislature was elected and seated. The constitution provided for more rights for freedmen and free men of color. The 9th Amendment on the 1776 constitution states, "That no freeman shall be convicted of any crime, but by the unanimous verdict of a jury of good lawful men, in open court, as heretofore used." Free men of color with sufficient property were allowed to vote.

The first North Carolina General Assembly was convened on April 7, 1777, in New Bern, North Carolina. It consisted of Senate with one member from each county of 38 existing counties and one district (Washington District which later became part of the Southwest Territory and then Tennessee) and a House of Commons with two members representing each of the existing 38 counties, plus one member from each of the large towns/districts (Edenton, Halifax, Hillsborough, New Bern, Salisbury, and Wilmington Districts). Districts continued to be represented in the Senate until 1835.

The first 18 General Assemblies met in various locations, including New Bern, Hillsboro, Halifax, Smithfield, and Wake Court House, Fayetteville. It was not until 1794 that the General Assembly met in the new state capital, Raleigh where it has met ever since.

Following Nat Turner's slave rebellion of 1831, the state legislature restricted many of the rights the 1776 Constitution provided for black people, making it illegal to teach a slave how to read or write. They also narrowed rights of free people of color, rescinding their franchise and the right to bear arms, and forbidding them from attending school or learning to read and write, as well as forbidding them from preaching in public.

The Constitutional Convention of 1835 retained the 1776 Constitution, but made several amendments to it. Going forward, the governor would be elected by the people, but the legislature elected all other officials, including US Senators. Amendments set the number of senators at 50 and the number of commoners (representatives to the House) at 120. Senators were to be elected from districts representing approximately equal numbers of citizens, rather than by geographic counties. Members of the House were still elected by county, but more populous counties were entitled to more representatives.

The North Carolina General Assembly met from 1861 to 1865 as part of the Confederate States of America.

Reconstruction Era
In 1868, a new constitution was passed by the Reconstruction era legislature, a biracial body dominated by Republicans. It changed the name of the House of Commons to the House of Representatives. It established the office of lieutenant governor. Previously, the speaker of the Senate was the constitutional successor to the governor in case of death or resignation. Property qualifications for holding office were abolished in order to enlarge opportunity. Finally, the legislature made executive officers and judges subject to popular election rather than appointment by the legislature.

African-American men were first elected to the state legislature in 1868, including Henry Epps, Abraham H. Galloway, and John A. Hyman in the Senate and Parker D. Robbins, Wilson Cary, B. W. Morris, A. W. Stevens, John S. Leary, Isham Sweat, Henry C. Cherry, John H. Williamson, A.A. Crawford, Cuffie Mayo, W. T. J. Hayes, Ivey Hutchings, John S. W. Eagles, George W. Price, Thomas A. Sykes, James H. Harris, William Cawthorn, and Richard Falkner in the House. Despite efforts by Red Shirts and other white Democratic paramilitary groups to disrupt Republican meetings and suppress black voting in order to ensure the Democratic takeover, some African Americans continued to be elected in the 19th century, especially to local offices. George Henry White was elected as US Congressman in 1894. But shortly before the turn of the century, the Democrats regained control of the state legislature (after a biracial coalition between Republicans and Populists had briefly held power) and passed laws to create barriers to voter registration through poll taxes, literacy tests and other devices.

Applied subjectively by white administrators, these methods effectively disenfranchised most blacks in the state. Black voters were eliminated by 1904. An estimated 75,000 black male citizens lost the vote. Congressman White did not run for a third term and, like many other talented black men, left the state for better opportunities in the North. African Americans were closed out of politics in North Carolina for decades, with most not regaining the ability to vote until after passage of the Voting Rights Act of 1965, and federal overview and enforcement.

20th century
Lillian Exum Clement became the first female member of the General Assembly in 1921.

As was the case in other states where rural legislators hung on to power despite changes in state demographics, North Carolina eventually had to redefine its method of electing house members and to reapportion congressional seats, which was supposed to be done after every decennial census. At a time of civil rights legislation to end segregation (Civil Rights Act of 1964) and enforce the constitutional right to vote for African Americans and other ethnic minority groups (Voting Rights Act of 1965), the US Supreme Court made rulings that resulted in corrections to state legislature representation and apportionment in several states.

Starting in 1966 (in the wake of Reynolds v. Sims, a US Supreme Court case establishing the principle of one man, one vote), members of the North Carolina State House were required to be elected from districts defined on the basis of roughly equal population, rather than from geographic counties. The county basis had resulted in a longstanding rural bias in the legislature. The new urban populations, including minorities and immigrants, were historically underrepresented in terms of legislative seats and funding, although the state's demographics and population had become increasingly urbanized. The court's ruling required changes also in other states with similar practices. The changes allowed full representation for the first time from some urban and more densely settled areas. It also meant that counties with low populations lost the chance to elect a resident member to the legislature.

Recent history
Legislators in both chambers serve two-year terms. Starting with the 2002 election, each legislator represents a single-member House or Senatorial district; prior to 2002, some districts elected multiple legislators.

In 2013, in the landmark Shelby County v. Holder case, the US Supreme Court invalidated a section of the Voting Rights Act of 1965, thereby freeing individual states to "change their election laws without advance federal approval". On August 12, 2013, Republican Governor Pat McCrory signed omnibus election law bill—House Bill 589 which added requirements for voting such as photo identification. In July 2016, the Fourth Circuit Court of Appeals struck down the restrictive election laws.

Current structure
The Senate has 50 members. Though its members represent districts that are larger than those of their colleagues in the House, its prerogatives and powers are no greater, other than (since 2017) the power to advise and consent to the governor's cabinet nominees.

The president of the Senate is the lieutenant governor of North Carolina, but the lieutenant governor has very limited powers and only votes to break a tie. Before the office of lieutenant governor was created in 1868, the Senate was presided over by a "speaker". After the 1988 election of James Carson Gardner, the first Republican lieutenant governor since Reconstruction, Democrats in control of the Senate shifted most of the power held by the lieutenant governor to the senator who is elected President Pro Tempore (or Pro-Tem). The president pro tempore appoints members to standing committees of the Senate, and holds great sway over bills.

The qualifications to be a senator are found in the state Constitution: "Each Senator, at the time of his election, shall not be less than 25 years of age, shall be a qualified voter of the State, and shall have resided in the State as a citizen for two years and in the district for which he is chosen for one year immediately preceding his election."

According to the state constitution, the Senate is also the "Court for the Trial of Impeachments". The House of Representatives has the power to impeach state officials, after which the Senate holds a trial, as in the federal system. If the governor or lieutenant governor is the official who has been impeached, the chief justice of the North Carolina Supreme Court presides.

The 120 members of the House of Representatives are led by a speaker, who holds powers similar to those of the Senate president pro-tem.

The qualifications to be a member of the House are found in the state constitution: "Each Representative, at the time of his election, shall be a qualified voter of the State, and shall have resided in the district for which he is chosen for one year immediately preceding his election." Elsewhere, the constitution specifies that no elected official shall be under twenty-one years of age and that no elected officials may deny the existence of God, although this provision is unenforceable under the U.S. Constitution (see ).

Sessions

Currently, the General Assembly meets in regular session (or the "long session") beginning in January of each odd-numbered year, and adjourns to reconvene the following even-numbered year for what is called the "short session". Though there is no limit on the length of any session, the "long session" typically lasts for 6 months, and the "short session" typically lasts for 6 weeks. Occasionally, in the case of a special need, the governor may call a Special Session of the General Assembly after it has adjourned for the year.

Prior to 1957, the General Assembly convened in January at a time fixed by the Constitution of North Carolina. From 1957 through 1967, sessions convened in February at a time fixed by the Constitution. The 1969 General Assembly was the first to convene on a date fixed by law after elimination of the constitutionally fixed date. The assembly now convenes on the third Wednesday after the second Monday in January after the November election.

Elections

Elections for all seats in both houses are held in each even-numbered year. If a seat should become vacant between elections, there are no by-elections or special elections. Rather, the local leaders of the political party of the person who vacated the seat nominate a replacement, to serve until the next election. The governor, ordinarily, accepts the nomination, and appoints that person. Until 1982, a legislator's term in office began immediately upon his or her election. Since then terms begin on January 1 after a legislator's election.

See also
 North Carolina State Capitol
 List of North Carolina state legislatures
 North Carolina Council of State

Notes

References

External links

 Blog by General Assembly's Director of Bill Drafting
 Online archive  of the North Carolina Legislative Journals of the General Assembly, 1822 to the present, from the State Library of North Carolina.
 Online archive  of the Public Documents of North Carolina containing executive and legislative documents produced for each year's General Assembly session, 1831 to 1919, from the State Library of North Carolina.
 Online archive  of the Session Laws of North Carolina, which include all ratified bills and resolutions in a given session of the General Assembly, 1817 to 2011, from the State Library of North Carolina.
 Guide to the Session Laws of North Carolina 

 
1715 establishments in the British Empire
Bicameral legislatures